Masayoshi Manabe (真鍋 政義 Manabe Masayoshi, born August 21, 1963 in Himeji, Hyōgo) is a Japanese volleyball coach and former player, who played as a setter for the Men's National Team in the 1980s and 1990s. He played at the 1988 Summer Olympics in Seoul, South Korea.  He took 10th place at the 1998 World Championship.

In December 2008, the Japan Volleyball Association announced it had invited him to be the head coach of the Women's National Volleyball Team.

Honours

1988 Olympic Games — 10th place
1998 World Championship — 16th place

References
 Profile

1963 births
Living people
Japanese men's volleyball players
Japanese volleyball coaches
Volleyball players at the 1988 Summer Olympics
Olympic volleyball players of Japan
People from Himeji, Hyōgo
Asian Games medalists in volleyball
Volleyball players at the 1990 Asian Games
Medalists at the 1990 Asian Games
Asian Games bronze medalists for Japan